Palmer Township may refer to:

 Palmer Township, Sherburne County, Minnesota
 Palmer Township, Divide County, North Dakota, in Divide County, North Dakota
 Palmer Township, Putnam County, Ohio
 Palmer Township, Washington County, Ohio
 Palmer Township, Northampton County, Pennsylvania

Township name disambiguation pages